Shai Dromi, born 1959, is an Israeli farmer who, in an act of self-defense, shot and killed an intruder and wounded another on 13 January 2007 at 3 am after discovering his dog had been poisoned, allegedly by four intruders. On 15 July 2009, he was acquitted of manslaughter but convicted on charges of illegal possession of weapons. The rifle he had used belonged to his father and was not registered in Dromi's name.

Dromi's farm is near Meitar in southern Israel, an area plagued by property theft. In the months leading up to the incident, several other dogs had been killed and a tractor and horse stolen.

Dromi testified at his trial: 
“I awoke at 3 AM to the barking of the guard dog that I acquired after my dogs were poisoned. Even though I was incredibly tired, I got out of bed and walked around the house. After I went back to bed, I again heard the dog barking irregularly. I went out with my weapon and didn’t see anything. I kept walking around [the perimeter of my] sheep pen, and noticed large metal wire-cutters. I panicked. I realized there were men around me."

When police arrived, Dromi was administering first aid to the intruder, a Bedouin, Khaled el-Atrash, who later died. Dromi was arrested and imprisoned for a month and later restrained from returning to his farm afterwards requiring volunteers to continue its maintenance.

A public uproar drew much attention to Dromi's plight and a law was proposed by Member of Knesset Yisrael Katz and later passed by a large majority in the Knesset. The law, commonly known as the 'Dromi Law', considers opposition to intruders as self-defence and modified the criminal law to allow repelling intruders from a house or agricultural facility if they had a criminal intent. Section 99 defined any criminal intrusion into a house as life-threatening, and classified that one does not need to retreat but section 98 defined that the law does not apply if one caused the intruders to enter the house.

See also 
 Castle doctrine
 Death of Yoshihiro Hattori

References

1959 births
Living people
Israeli farmers
Self-defense
Defensive gun use
Deaths by firearm in Israel
People acquitted of manslaughter
2007 in Israel
People convicted of illegal possession of weapons